The Mistick Krewe of Comus, founded in 1856, is a New Orleans, Louisiana, Carnival Krewe. It is the oldest continuous organization of New Orleans Mardi Gras festivities.

Before Comus was organized, Carnival celebrations in New Orleans were mostly confined to the Catholic Creole community, and parades were irregular and often very informally organized. Comus was organized by largely French Catholics and Protestant Anglo-Americans.

In 1991, the New Orleans City Council passed an ordinance that required social organizations to certify publicly that they did not discriminate on the basis of race, religion, gender, disability, or sexual orientation, in order to obtain parade permits and other public licensure. The Comus organization (along with Momus and Proteus, other 19th-century Krewes) withdrew from parading rather than racially integrating.

History and formation 

Building on the initial work of what French Creole American nobleman, and playboy, Bernard de Marigny had done in 1833, funding the first official Mardi Gras; celebration, in December 1856, six Anglo-American men of New Orleans gathered at Dr. John Pope's Drug Store on the Corner of Jackson and Prytania, a favorite rendezvous for the young men of the Fourth District, to begin to organize a secret society to observe Mardi Gras in a  more formal and organized fashion than their Creole predecessors. These men invited their businessmen friends, a group of some thirty to forty people, to meet at a club room above the now-defunct Gem Restaurant/Saloon in New Orleans' Vieux Carre on Jan 4, 1857, to organize the Carnival society. The inspiration for the name came from John Milton's Lord of Misrule in his masque Comus. Part of the inspiration for the parade was a Mobile, Alabama, Carnival mystic society, with annual parades, called the Cowbellion de Rakin Society (from 1830),.

Founding members: Samuel Manning Todd, a drygoods merchant from Utica, New York, who arrived in New Orleans by way of Mobile, Alabama, like a few others. Frank Shaw, Jr., commission merchant from New York State; Lloyd Dulany Addison (son of Walter Dulany Addison, of the Oxon Hill Manor Addisons, members of the Tidewater gentry) born in Kentucky, partner Bullitt, Miller & Co. merchants and cotton factors; Dr. John H. Pope, credited with naming the group, from New York State originally, and Joseph Ellison, owned Pope, Ellison & Co., commission merchants-Pope was also a pharmacist owning Pope's Drugstore at the corner of Jackson and Prytania where this small coterie initially organized, he was born in Louisville, Kentucky; brother William Ellison, partner of firm Starke & Ellison, Cotton Brokers was born in Pittsburgh, Pennsylvania.

The new group acquired the costumes, floats, flambeaux, and even theme — their very name, Comus — from the 1856 Cowbellion parade (Milton's “Paradise Lost”). There are also indications that Striker's Independent Society from Mobile, Alabama, were involved, and they went en masse to the first Comus event.

One Mardi Gras historian describes The Mistick Krewe's creation in New Orleans thus:

 It was Comus, who, in 1857, saved and transformed the dying flame of the old Creole Carnival with his enchanter's cup; it was Comus who introduced torch-lit processions and thematic floats to Mardi Gras; and it was Comus who ritually closed, and still closes, the most cherished festivities of New Orleans with splendor and pomp.

Comus' first night parade – replete with torches (which later came to be known as "flambeaux"), marching bands, and rolling floats – was wildly popular with Carnival revelers. So popular was the first Comus parade that the prospect of its second one attracted, for the first time, thousands of out-of-town visitors to New Orleans for the Carnival celebration.

Like that of other old established krewes, including Rex and Momus, Comus's history includes ties to white supremacy, particularly New Orleans's White League. Opposition to Reconstruction-era reforms prompted parade themes such as 1873's "The Missing Links to Darwin's Origin of Species" and 1877's "The Aryan Race."

Parade 
The Mistick Krewe presented a parade annually on the evening of Shrove Tuesday from 1857 to 1991 with some exceptions including during war. From 1885 to 1890 while the Mistick Krewe of Comus did not parade, the evening parade on Shrove Tuesday was the Krewe of Proteus. In 1890 Comus began parading again as the final parade on Mardi Gras with Proteus reverting to the evening of Lundi Gras.

Parade themes

Gallery

Costumes and Floats

Invitations

Parade

Programs

Tableau

Respites from revelry 
From the first Comus parade until a police strike in 1979, nothing suspended New Orleans' lavish Mardi Gras celebrations except war. On March 1, 1862, Comus issued his first proclamation suspending Carnival revelry on account of war. On that day, the New Orleans Daily Picayune published this notice:

Comus issued an identical proclamation in 1917 (for World War I), another in 1942 (for World War II), and again in 1951 (for the Korean War). On each occasion, the Captain of Comus persuaded the Captains of other Krewes to refrain from organized revelry during international hostilities.

From 1885–1889, the Mistick Krewe chose not to parade, although other observances continued. During this period, the Krewe of Proteus moved its parade to Carnival night.  When Comus resumed parading in 1890, Proteus refused a request to withdraw from parading on Mardi Gras night.  The same year, the two parades collided on Canal Street, nearly reaching an impasse.  As the Captains of the two groups exchanged defiant expressions, a Comus masker diverted the horse bearing the Captain of Proteus, and Comus was able to complete its procession.

Withdrawal from parading 

In 1991 the New Orleans City Council, led by Democrat Dorothy Mae Taylor, passed an ordinance that required social organizations, including Mardi Gras Krewes, to certify publicly that they did not discriminate on the basis of race, religion, gender, disability, or sexual orientation, in order to obtain parade permits and other public licensure. The Comus organization (along with Momus and Proteus, other 19th-century Krewes) withdrew from parading, rather than racially integrating (Proteus returned to parading in 2000). Two federal courts later decided that the ordinance was an unconstitutional infringement on First Amendment rights of free association and an unwarranted intrusion into the privacy of the groups subject to the ordinance. The Krewe of Comus never resumed its parading.

Early affiliation with The Pickwick Club 

It is generally known by now that the Pickwick Club, in its beginnings, was the public shield behind which the revelries of the Mistick Krewe were planned and executed. The two were one, but only the Club was known to the public, and the allegiance of the early Pickwickian to the Misktick Krewe was a sacred secret. The fame of each grew independently until distinction became necessary in 1884. The Krewe came first into being, but soon resolved itself into the Club, in the same tradition as The Louisiana Club and the Knights of Momus along with The Stratford Club and the High Priests of Mithras carry one today.

In the 20th and early 21st centuries, their membership is not identical; but it is believed that there are members common to both groups.

Carnival secrecy and exclusivity 

The Mistick Krewe has jealously guarded the identities of its membership and the privacy of its activities (other than its parade), perhaps even more than the other Carnival organizations subscribing to the traditional code of secrecy.

Legend has it that admittance to the Mistick Krewe's ball was so highly sought-after that a group of uninvited ladies formed a flying wedge and attempted to force their way into the Comus ball. In other years, uninvited persons have tried to beg, buy, or steal invitations to the ball.

Even after the Mystic Krewe of Comus ball is over, its invitations are prized by collectors. They are both rare and uncommonly beautiful.

Meeting of the courts 

The Mistick Krewe of Comus also originated another Carnival tradition: the "Meeting of the Courts."  The practice originated in 1882, when Rex (the King of Carnival) and his Queen paid a formal visit to the throne of Comus.  This ritualized meeting eventually evolved into the symbolic conclusion of the Mardi Gras season, a practice which continues to this day.

Although Rex is the titular King, some observers believe that the Meeting of the Courts – in which Rex leaves his own festivities and is received by a seated Comus at the Mistick Krewe's bal masque – establishes Comus as the more prestigious of the two organizations in the Carnival hierarchy.

Mardi Gras parades 
The first Comus parade was held on Mardi Gras 1857, and this became an annual event. Other organizations sprang up in New Orleans in the 19th century, inspired by the Comus model, and also came to be known as Krewes.

Parading on Mardi Gras night, Comus was the final parade of the carnival season for over 100 years. It was much smaller and more sedate than the other parades of the day put on by Rex and the Zulu Social Aid & Pleasure Club.

The Comus parades became known for their sometimes obscure themes relating to ancient history and mythology. While other New Orleans parades, especially the newer super krewes of Endymion and Bacchus, might have a theme such as "Foods of the World" or "Broadway Show Tunes," Comus would present themes on the order of "Serpent Deities of the Ancient Near East."

See also 
Striker's Independent Society
The Pickwick Club
Knights of Momus
Krewe
Twelfth Night Revelers

References

Mardi Gras in New Orleans
Organizations established in 1856
1856 establishments in Louisiana
Louisiana Creole culture in New Orleans